Nede, also known as Nedeoi was a town of ancient Arcadia mentioned by Stephanus of Byzantium.

It took its name from the nymph Nede (Νέδη).

Its site is unlocated.

References

Populated places in ancient Arcadia
Former populated places in Greece
Lost ancient cities and towns